Neoclassical compounds are compound words composed from combining forms (which act as affixes or stems) derived from classical Latin or ancient Greek roots. New Latin comprises many such words and is a substantial component of the technical and scientific lexicon of English and other languages, via international scientific vocabulary (ISV). For example, bio- combines with -graphy to form biography ("life" + "writing/recording").

Source of international technical vocabulary

Neoclassical compounds represent a significant source of Neo-Latin vocabulary. Moreover, since these words are composed from classical languages whose prestige is or was respected throughout the Western European culture, these words typically appear in many different languages. Their widespread use makes technical writing generally accessible to readers who may only have a smattering of the language in which it appears.

Not all European languages have been equally receptive to neoclassical technical compounds. German and Russian, for instance, have historically attempted to create their own technical vocabularies from native elements. Usually, these creations are German and Russian calques on the international vocabulary, such as Wasserstoff and "водород" (vodoród) for hydrogen. Like any exercise in language prescription, this endeavour has been only partially successful, so while official German may still speak of a Fernsprecher, public telephones will be labelled with the internationally recognized Telefon.

Formation, spelling, and pronunciation

These words are compounds formed from Latin and Ancient Greek root words. Ancient Greek words are almost invariably romanized (see transliteration of Ancient Greek into English). In English: 
Ancient Greek αι becomes e or  æ/ae;
Ancient Greek groups with γ plus a velar stop consonant such as γγ, γκ or γξ become ng, nc (or nk in more recent borrowings) and nx respectively;
Ancient Greek ει often becomes i (occasionally it is retained as ei);
Ancient Greek θ becomes th;
Ancient Greek κ becomes c (subject to palatalization in English pronunciation) or k; 
Ancient Greek οι becomes e or sometimes œ/oe in British English;
Ancient Greek ου usually becomes u, or occasionally ou;
Ancient Greek  (rho with spiritus asper) becomes rh;
Ancient Greek υ becomes y;
Ancient Greek φ becomes ph or, very rarely, f;
Ancient Greek χ becomes ch;
Ancient Greek ψ becomes ps;
Ancient Greek ω becomes o;
Ancient Greek rough breathing becomes h-.
Thus, for example, Ancient Greek σφιγξ becomes English (and Latin) sphinx. Exceptions to these romanizing rules occur, such as leukemia (leukaemia); compare leukocyte, also leucocyte. In Latin, and in the target languages, the Greek vowels are given their neoclassical values rather than their contemporary values in demotic Greek.

Ancient Greek words often contain consonant clusters which are foreign to the phonology of contemporary English and other languages that incorporate these words into their lexicon: diphthong; pneumatology, phthisis. The traditional response in English is to treat the unfamiliar cluster as containing one or more silent letters and suppress their pronunciation, more modern speakers tend to try and pronounce the unusual cluster. This adds to the irregularities of English spelling; moreover, since many of these words are encountered in writing more often than they are heard spoken, it introduces uncertainty as to how to pronounce them when encountered.

Neoclassical compounds frequently vary their stressed syllable when suffixes are added: ágriculture, agricúltural. This also gives rise to uncertainty when these words are encountered in print. Once a classical compound has been created and borrowed, it typically becomes the foundation of a whole series of related words: e.g. astrology, astrological, astrologer/astrologist/astrologian, astrologism.

Mainstream medical and ISV pronunciation in English is not the same as Classical Latin pronunciation. Like Ecclesiastical Latin, it has a regularity of its own, and individual sounds can be mapped or compared.

History and reception 
English began incorporating many of these words in the sixteenth century; geography first appeared in an English text in 1535. Other early adopted words that still survive include mystagogue, from the 1540s, and androgyne, from the 1550s. The use of these technical terms predates the scientific method; the several varieties of divination all take their names from neoclassical compounds, such as alectryomancy, divination by the pecking of chickens.

Not all English writers have been friendly to the inflow of classical vocabulary. The Tudor period writer Sir John Cheke wrote:

and therefore rejected what he called "inkhorn terms".

Similar sentiments moved the nineteenth century author William Barnes to write "pure English," in which he avoided Greco-Latin words and find Anglo-Saxon equivalents therefor: for Barnes, the newly invented art of the photograph became a sun-print. Unlike this one, some of Barnes's coinages caught on, such as foreword, Barnes's replacement for the preface of a book. Later, Poul Anderson wrote a jocular piece called Uncleftish Beholding in a constructed language based on English which others have called "Ander-Saxon"; this attempted to create a pure English vocabulary for nuclear physics. For more information, see Linguistic purism in English.

More recent developments 
Many such words, such as thermometer, dinosaur, rhinoceros, and rhododendron, are thoroughly incorporated into the English lexicon and are the ordinary words for their referents. Some are prone to colloquial shortening; rhinoceros often becomes rhino. The binomial nomenclature of taxonomy and biology is a major source for these items of vocabulary; for many unfamiliar species that lack a common English name, the name of the genus becomes the English word for that life form.

In the metric system, prefixes that indicate multipliers are typically Greek in origin, such as kilogram, while those that indicate divisors are Latin, as in millimeter: the base roots resemble Greek words, but in truth are neologisms. These metric and other suffixes are added to native English roots as well, resulting in creations such as gigabyte. Words of mixed Latin and Greek lineage, or words that combine elements of the classical languages with English – so-called hybrid words – were formerly castigated as "barbarisms" by prescriptionist usage commentators; this disapproval has mostly abated. Indeed, in scientific nomenclature, even more exotic hybrids have appeared, such as for example the dinosaur Yangchuanosaurus. Personal names appear in some scientific names such as Fuchsia.

Neoclassical compounds are sometimes used to lend grandeur or the impression of scientific rigour to humble pursuits: the study of cosmetology will not help anyone become an astronaut. Compounds along these models are also sometimes coined for humorous effect, such as odontopodology, the science of putting your foot into your mouth. These humorous coinages sometimes take on a life of their own, such as garbology, the study of garbage.

Some neoclassical compounds form classical plurals, and are therefore irregular in English. Others do not, while some vacillate between classical and regular plurals.

Translation
There are hundreds of neoclassical compounds in English and other European languages. As traditionally defined, combining forms cannot stand alone as free words, but there are many exceptions to this rule, and in the late 20th century such forms are increasingly used independently: bio as a clipping of biography, telly as a respelt clipping of television. Most neoclassical combining forms translate readily into everyday language, especially nouns: bio- as ‘life’ -graphy as ‘writing, description’. Because of this, the compounds of which they are part (usually classical or learned compounds) can be more or less straightforwardly paraphrased: biography as ‘writing about a life’, neurology as ‘the study of the nervous system’. Many classical combining forms are designed to take initial or final position: autobiography has the two initial or preposed forms auto- and bio-, and one postposed form -graphy. Although most occupy one position or the other, some can occupy both: -graph- as in graphology and monograph; -phil- as in philology and Anglophile. Occasionally, the same base is repeated in one word: logology the study of words, phobophobia the fear of fear.

Preposed and postposed
Prefixes include: aero- air, crypto- hidden, demo- people, geo- earth, odonto- tooth, ornitho- bird, thalasso- sea. Many have both a traditional simple meaning and a modern telescopic meaning: in biology, bio- means ‘life’, but in bio-degradable it telescopes ‘biologically’; although hypno- basically means ‘sleep’ (hypnopaedia learning through sleep), it also stands for ‘hypnosis’ (hypnotherapy cure through hypnosis).

When a form stands alone as a present-day word, it is usually a telescopic abbreviation: bio biography, chemo chemotherapy, hydro hydroelectricity, metro metropolitan. Some telescoped forms are shorter than the original neoclassical combining form: gynie is shorter than gyneco- and stands for both gynecology and gynecologist; anthro is shorter than anthropo- and stands for anthropology.

Suffixes include: -ectomy cutting out, -graphy writing, description, -kinesis motion, -logy study, -mancy divination, -onym name, -phagy eating, -phony sound, -therapy healing, -tomy cutting. They are generally listed in dictionaries without the interfixed vowel, which appears however in such casual phrases as ‘ologies and isms’.

Variants
Some classical combining forms are variants of one base.

Some are also free words, such as mania in dipsomania and phobia in claustrophobia.

Some are composites of other elements, such as encephalo- brain, from en- in, -cephal- head; and -ectomy cutting out, from ec- out, -tom- cut, -y, a noun-forming suffix that means "process of".

Formation
In Greek and Latin grammar, combining bases usually require a thematic or stem-forming vowel. In biography, from Greek, the thematic is -o-; in agriculture, from Latin, it is -i-. In English morphology, this vowel can be considered as an interfix: in biology, the interfix -o-; in miniskirt, the interfix -i-. It is usually regarded as attached to the initial base (bio-, mini-) rather than the final base (-graphy, -skirt), but in forms where it is conventionally stressed, it is sometimes considered as part of the final base (-ography, -ology). If the final element begins with a vowel (for example, -archy as in monarchy), the mediating vowel has traditionally been avoided (not *), but in recent coinages it is often kept, sometimes accompanied by a hyphen (auto-analysis, bioenergy, hydroelectricity, not *, *bienergy, *).

Its presence helps to distinguish neoclassical compounds like biography and agriculture from vernacular compounds like teapot and blackbird.

Origin

Generally, English has acquired its neoclassical compounds in three ways: through French from Latin and Greek, directly from Latin and Greek, and by coinage in English on Greek and Latin patterns. An exception is schizophrenia, which came into English through German, and is therefore pronounced ‘skitso’, not ‘’.

Terminological variation
Most dictionaries follow the Oxford English Dictionary in using combining form (comb. form) to label such classical elements. In appendices to dictionaries and grammar books, classical combining forms are often loosely referred to as roots or affixes: ‘a logo …, properly speaking, is not a word at all but a prefix meaning word and short for logogram, a symbol, much as telly is short for television’ (Montreal Gazette, 13 Apr. 1981). They are often referred to as affixes because some come first and some come last. But if they were affixes proper, a word like biography would have no base whatever. While affixes are grammatical (like prepositions), classical combining forms are lexical (like nouns, adjectives, and verbs): for example, bio- translates as a noun (life), -graphy as a verbal noun (writing). This is why some reference works also call them stems. They are also often loosely called roots because they are ancient and have a basic role in word formation, but functionally and often structurally they are distinct from roots proper: the -graph in autograph is both a root and a classical combining form, while the -graphy in cryptography consists of root -graph- and suffix -y, and is only a classical combining form.

Philology

Conservative philological tradition
From the Renaissance until the mid-20th century, the concept of derivational purity has often regulated the use of classical compounds, with a philological goal of like with like (Greek with Greek, Latin with Latin) and a minimum of hybridization. For example, biography is Greek, agriculture Latin; but this ideal has seen only limited realization in practice, as for example the word television is a hybrid of Greek tele- and Latin -vision (probably so coined because the ‘pure’ form telescope had already been adopted for another purpose).

Contemporary developments
Generally, classical compounds were a closed system from the 16th century to the earlier 20th century: the people who used them were classically educated, their teachers and exemplars generally took a purist's view on their use, contexts of use were mainly technical, and there was relatively little seepage into the language at large. However, with the decline of classical education and the spread of technical and quasitechnical jargon in the media, a continuum has evolved, with at least five stages:

Pure classical usage
In the older sciences, classical combining forms are generally used to form such strictly classical and usually Greek compounds as anthocyanin, astrobleme, chemotherapy, chronobiology, cytokinesis, glossolalia, lalophobia, narcolepsy, osteoporosis, Pliohippus, sympathomimetic.

Hybrid classical usage
In technical, semitechnical, and quasitechnical usage at large, coiners of compounds increasingly treat Latin and Greek as one resource to produce such forms as accelerometer, aero-generator, bioprospector, communicology, electroconductive, futurology, mammography, micro-gravity, neoliberal, Scientology, servomechanism.

Hybrid classical/vernacular usage
In the later 20th century, many forms have cut loose from ancient moorings: crypto- as in preposed Crypto-Fascist and pseudo- as in pseudoradical; postposed -meter in speedometer, clapometer. Processes of analogy have created coinages like petrodollar, psycho-warfare, microwave on such models as petrochemical, psychology, microscope. Such stunt usages as eco-doom, eco-fears, eco-freaks, common in journalism, often employ classical combining forms telescopically: eco- standing for ecology and ecological and not as used in economics. In such matters, precision of meaning is secondary to compactness and vividness of expression.

Combining forms as separate words
In recent years, the orthography of many word forms has changed, usually without affecting pronunciation and stress. The same spoken usage may be written micro-missile, micro missile, micromissile, reflecting the same uncertainty or flexibility as in businessman, business-man, business man. When used in such ways, classical compounds are often telescopic: Hydro substation Hydro-Electricity Board substation, Metro highways Metropolitan highways, porno cult pornography cult.

New classical compounds
The mix of late 20th century techno-commercial coinages includes three groups of post- and non-classical forms: (1) Established forms: econo- from ‘economic’, as in econometric, Econo-Car; mini- from ‘miniature’, as in miniskirt, mini-boom; -matic from ‘automatic’, as in Adjustamatic, Instamatic, Stackomatic. (2) Less established forms, often created by blending: accu- from ‘accurate’, as in Accuvision; compu- from ‘computer’, as in Compucorp; docu- from ‘documentary’, as in docudrama; perma- from ‘permanent’, as in permafrost and permaban; dura- from ‘durable’, as in Duramark. (3) Informal vernacular material in pseudo-classical form: Easibird, Healthitone, Redi-pak, Relax-A-Cizor (relax, exerciser).

Similar systems 
In East Asia, a similar role to Latin and Greek has been played by Chinese, with non-Chinese languages both borrowing a significant number of words from Chinese and using morphemes borrowed from Chinese to coin new words, particularly in formal or technical language. See Sino-Japanese vocabulary, Sino-Korean vocabulary, and Sino-Vietnamese vocabulary for discussion.

Many of these have been subsequently borrowed into Chinese, Korean, and Vietnamese, with the same (or corresponding) characters being pronounced differently according to language, just as happens in European languages – compare English biology and French biologie.

For example, 自動車 (Japanese jidōsha, Korean jadongcha, Mandarin zìdòngchē) is a Japanese-coined word meaning “automobile”, literally self-move-car; compare to auto (self) + mobile (moving).

See also 
Topics
 English words of Greek origin
 Hybrid word
 Interlingua
 International scientific vocabulary
 Internationalism (linguistics)
 -ism
 Latin influence in English
 -ology
Sino-xenic vocabularies, for similar constructs in Korean, Japanese, Vietnamese, etc.

Lists
 List of Germanic and Latinate equivalents in English
 List of Greek and Latin roots in English
 List of Latin and Greek words commonly used in systematic names
 List of Latin words with English derivatives

Bibliography 
 McArthur, Tom (ed.): The Oxford Companion to the English Language, (Oxford University Press, 1992). 
 Plag, Ingo "Word-Formation in English", Cambridge University Press, 2003, ISBN à0521525632, 9780521525633

External links 
 Concise Oxford Companion to the English Language 1998 entries on classical compound and combining form

English grammar
Etymology
Linguistic morphology
Greek language
Latin language